The 1998 Alfred Dunhill Cup was the 14th Alfred Dunhill Cup. It was a team tournament featuring 16 countries, each represented by three players. The Cup was played 8–11 October at the Old Course at St Andrews in Scotland. The sponsor was the Alfred Dunhill company. The South African team of Ernie Els, David Frost, and Retief Goosen beat the Spanish team of Miguel Ángel Jiménez, Santiago Luna, and José María Olazábal in the final. It was the second win for South Africa, with the same team having won in 1997.

Format
The Cup was a match play event played over four days. The teams were divided into four four-team groups.  After three rounds of round-robin play, the top team in each group advanced to a single elimination playoff.

In each team match, the three players were paired with their opponents and played 18 holes at medal match play. Matches tied at the end of 18 holes were extended to a sudden-death playoff. The tie-breaker for ties within a group was based on match record, then head-to-head.

Group play

Round one
Source:

Group 1

Group 2

Clarke won on the fourth playoff hole.

Group 3

Group 4

Elkington won on the first playoff hole.

Round two
Source:

Group 1

Grönberg won on the first playoff hole.

Group 2

Group 3

Gögele won on the second playoff hole.
Strüver won on the second playoff hole.

Group 4

Shin won on the first playoff hole.

Round three
Source:

Group 1

Group 2

Jiménez won on the first playoff hole.

Group 3

Group 4

Shin won on the first playoff hole.

Standings

Playoffs
Source:

Bracket

Semi-finals

Final

Team results

Player results

References

External links
Coverage on the European Tour's official site

Alfred Dunhill Cup
Alfred Dunhill Cup
Alfred Dunhill Cup
Alfred Dunhill Cup